Jason Weir-Smith (born 8 August 1975) is a former professional tennis player from South Africa.

Career
Weir-Smith won the doubles title at the Coffee Bowl junior tournament in 1993, with Juan Antonio Marín as his partner.

A doubles specialist, Weir-Smith played collegiate tennis at Texas Christian University and was a doubles All-American while playing with the Horned Frogs in 1996 and 1997.

The South African competed in the men's doubles at six Grand Slam tournaments during his career, including all four in 2001. He made the second round at the 2001 French Open (with Neville Godwin) and 2001 US Open (with Aleksandar Kitinov).

He never reached a final on the ATP Tour but was a doubles semi-finalist on four occasions, at Umag in 2000, the 2000 Brighton International, the 2001 Heineken Open in Auckland and Munich's BMW Open in 2001. His partner in Umag, Brighton and Auckland was Paul Rosner and he partnered John-Laffnie de Jager in Munich.

Challenger titles

Doubles: (5)

References

1975 births
Living people
South African male tennis players
TCU Horned Frogs men's tennis players
Tennis players from Johannesburg